Lincoln Maazel (February 12, 1903 – September 15, 2009) was an American singer and actor of stage and screen.

Biography

Maazel was born on February 12, 1903, in New York City to Russian Jewish parents. In 1920, aged 17, he and 30 other young people were picked to perform at the Shubert Theater on Broadway, where he sang the Prologue to Pagliacci. He later moved to Los Angeles, California and developed into a performer at nightclubs and for local television.

As an actor, Maazel did not start an onstage career until he was 56 but proceeded to appear in stage plays for the Pittsburgh Playhouse, the Civic Light Opera, Little Lake Theater, Mountainview Playhouse, Odd Chair Playhouse and White Barn Theatre. In 1977, he appeared in the screen role for which he is best known in George A. Romero's Martin.

In 1928 he married his wife Marie (died 1993) in Paris. On March 6, 1930, his son, conductor Lorin Maazel (1930–2014) was born. In 2003 he became a centenarian. He died six years later on September 15, 2009, in Castleton, Virginia, United States, at the age of 106.

Filmography

References
Profile of Lincoln Maazel

External links
 

1903 births
2009 deaths
Singers from New York City
Singers from Los Angeles
Jewish American male actors
American centenarians
Male actors from New York City
Male actors from Los Angeles
20th-century American male actors
20th-century American singers
American male stage actors
Jewish American musicians
Men centenarians
20th-century American Jews
21st-century American Jews